Family Matters is an American sitcom that originally aired from 1989 to 1998.

Family Matters may also refer to:
Family Matters, journal of the Australian Institute of Family Studies 
Family Matters (1993 film), a film directed by Susanne Bier
Family Matters (2022 film), an upcoming Philippine family drama film
Family Matters (novel), 2002
Family Matters (Singaporean TV series), 2006–present
Family Matters (Philippine TV series), 2010–present
"Family Matters" (Supernatural), an episode of the television series Supernatural
Jo Frost: Family Matters, a British television talk show
"Family Matters", a 1990 episode of the TV series In the Heat of the Night
Family Matters, a 2006 novel by Ira Berkowitz

See also
A Family Matter (disambiguation)
Sociology of the family